Emergency Unit, better known as simply E.U. is a 2009 Hong Kong television drama created and produced by Wong Wai-sing. It is the direct sequel to 2007's On the First Beat and the third installment in The Academy series. E.U. stars Ron Ng and Sammul Chan from the original series, with the addition of Michael Miu, Kathy Chow, Michael Tse, and Elanne Kong. The popularity of Tse's role, Laughing Gor, spawned two film spin-offs and a television drama spin-off of the character.

Unlike the two previous installments, E.U. focuses on one particular secret triad, while the first two focuses more on the general lives of the characters. E.U. stands for Emergency Unit, a traffic and criminal operation wing under the Hong Kong Police Force. The series was meant to be followed by a sequel, however, production dropped the sequel, but reused the majority of its cast in an alternate series, Relic of an Emissary.

Synopsis
After ten years behind the bars in Taiwan, Kong Sai-Hau (Michael Miu) finally returns to Hong Kong. Other than the hope to find his daughter Yau-Yau (Elanne Kong) to mend their relationship, he also plans for revenge. On one hand, he pretends to surrender to triad boss To Yik-Tin (Lam Lee), the man who caused him to be jailed. On the other hand, he tries to gain trust from police officers Chung Lap-Man (Ron Ng) and Lee Pak-Kiu (Sammul Chan). Lee refuses to have a criminal as his friend, but Chung becomes close to Kong to gain inside information about To's activities. Laughing (Michael Tse) doesn't trust Kong at first, but Kong uses To's wife Ching Yeuk-Sam (Kathy Chow) in the organization as an influence to help him rise up the ranks. To is killed and Kong ascends to become the head of the triad. Later, Chung becomes an official undercover agent for the police force with the intention of exposing Kong's triad crimes. He isolates himself from Lee in order to protect his undercover identity. He meets Kong's daughter Kong Yau Yau, and Yau Yau starts to fall in love with him. Chung uses this to his advantage, gaining trust and higher rank in the triad.

Later on, Kong falls deeply in love with Sum and vice versa causing him to be distracted with his drug business. Kong eventually trusts Chung and almost hands parts of his drug business to Chung to take care of. But just when Kong thought that he was in control, his drug business fails. Kong discovers that the people he trusted the most had betrayed him, including Laughing. He also misinterprets that Sum betrayed him, so he kills her. His daughter Kong Yau Yau finds out and hates him for killing Sum, whom she thought of as a mother. Chung and Lee find out that Laughing was actually also an undercover cop, and both are wracked with feelings of guilt and gain a renewed sense of responsibility to take down Kong.

In the end, Kong's paranoia of betrayal causes him to be immobile for the rest of his life.

Cast

The Kong family

Police unit

Triad

Other

Reception
The series shifted into a much darker theme compared to the last two instalments with its focus more on triads. It received mostly positive responses, particularly for Michael Tse's performance. His performance in E.U. is regarded as one of the best performances in his career. He is also favored to win Best Supporting Actor award in 2009's TVB Anniversary Awards. Due to overwhelming criticism of Tse's character's demise, Tse appeared and spoke in the last scene of the series and a prequel of E.U based on Laughing's life, entitled Turning Point, was produced. It was premiered on August 10, 2009 and was released in cinemas on 13 August 2009. The television spinoff Lives of Omission was released in 2011 based on his character.

However, Leung Ka Ki's role as "Fa Yeuk-Bo" receive almost complete negative response from viewers; this is somehow odd given that Ka Ki's role in the series is supposed to be a "good character", although one possible reason is the character's stereotypical attitude towards the triads.

Notes
Joey Yung didn't reprise her role as Cheung Nim-Yan, Chung Lap-Man's (Ron Ng) girlfriend. To end her involvement in the series, it's been explained that the couple had separated and she left Hong Kong after marrying another man.
Kate Tsui from the previous installment also left the series.
Michael Tao's character doesn't return to the series either but references to his character are made. His newborn son and him immigrated sometime between On the First Beat and E.U.

Awards and nominations
TVB Anniversary Awards (2009)

Won
 Best Supporting Actor (Michael Tse)
 Most Improved Actress (Aimee Chan)
Nominated
 Best Drama
 Best Actor (Michael Miu)
 Best Actress (Kathy Chow)
 Best Supporting Actor (Joel Chan)
 Best Supporting Actress (Elanne Kong)
 My Favourite Male Character (Michael Miu)
 My Favourite Male Character (Michael Tse)
 My Favourite Female Character (Kathy Chow)

Viewership ratings

See also
Turning Point (2009 action film)
Lives of Omission
Relic of an Emissary

References

External links
TVB.com E.U. - Official Website 
K for TVB E.U. - Screen Captures and Summary 

TVB dramas
2009 Hong Kong television series debuts
2009 Hong Kong television series endings
Triad (organized crime)